The 2023 Baltic States Swimming Championships was held in Riga, Latvia, between March 3 and March 4.

Some events were also held separately for youth and junior boys and girls.

The championships served as a qualifier for the Paris 2024 Olympics and the 2023 World Aquatics Championships.

Medal table

Events 
Freestyle: 50 m, 100 m, 200 m, 400 m
Backstroke: 50 m, 100 m, 200 m
Breaststroke: 50 m, 100 m, 200 m
Butterfly: 50 m, 100 m, 200 m
Individual medley: 200 m, 400 m
Relay: 4×100 m free, 4×100 m medley

Results

Men's events

Women's events

References

Citations

General 
Results

External links
Latvian Swimming Federation

2023
2023 in Latvian sport
2023 in swimming
International sports competitions hosted by Latvia
Sports competitions in Riga
March 2023 sports events in Europe